Lankower See (Dechow) is a lake in the Nordwestmecklenburg district in Mecklenburg-Vorpommern, Germany.

Lakes of Mecklenburg-Western Pomerania